The Watford Ring Road is a road located in Watford, Hertfordshire, UK. It is numbered A411, and serves as a one way system around the town centre. It has decreased traffic through the town centre, and now provides links to every part of Watford, as well as the M1 motorway (by way of the A4008 road).

The ring road essentially acts as one big roundabout around the town centre, whilst also having bus stops and roads in towards the centre. There are numerous multi-storey car parks that can be reached from the ring road: Palace, Queens, Kings, Church, Gade and Sutton. These are connected to the Harlequin Shopping Centre and Watford Town Centre.

The road is a typical example of 1960s town planning: grade separation is used on three occasions to separate the traffic from pedestrians and cycles. The most notable of these is the large bridge which takes the road across Watford's High Street. Another example is the short branch from the ring road to the A412 road, which crosses an underpass before joining with the latter at a full-blown grade separated junction.

Roads in Hertfordshire